Selma Emiroğlu Aykan (17 May 1928 – 4 October 2011) was the first female cartoonist in Turkey. She was also an opera singer.

Life
She was born in İstanbul on 17 May 1928. She studied  Üsküdar American Academy, but before graduation, she left the school and entered the  Conservatoire of İstanbul Municipality.

In 1963, she married Aydın Aykan and moved to Berlin, West Germany. She gave birth to a daughter named Aylin. She died on 4 October 2011 in Tutzing, Germany.

Cartoonist career
During her childhood, she was fond of drawing. Her mother sent some of her drawings to Cemal Nadir Güler, a renowned cartoonist of the 1940s. Her first cartoon appeared on the Amcabey periodical of Güler as early as 1943. When Doğan Kardeş, the children's periodical began to be published by Kazım Taşkent, the founder of Yapı Kredi Bank, she began drawing for the publication.

She created the funnies Kara Kedi Çetesi ("The Black Cat Gang"). In 1949, when the Indian prime minister Jawaharlal Nehru sent an elephant to Turkey as a present for Turkish children, Emiroğlu drew a welcome cartoon on the cover page of Doğan Kardeş.

Music
She was one of the sopranos of the İstanbul Opera. She played the leading role in La Traviata in İstanbul. While in Germany, she concentrated more on music.

References

1928 births
Artists from Istanbul
Turkish women cartoonists
Turkish female comics artists
20th-century Turkish women opera singers
Turkish expatriates in Germany
2011 deaths